Straßberg may refer to:

Places in Germany
Straßberg, Saxony-Anhalt, a town in the district of Harz of Saxony-Anhalt
Straßberg, Zollernalbkreis, a town in the Zollernalbkreis of Baden-Württemberg
Straßberg, one of the communities amalgamated to form Bobingen, Bavaria, in 1972

Other uses
Straßberg, one of the Castles in South Tyrol
 Funkgerät (FuG 230) Straßburg, one of two receivers in the Kehl-Strasbourg radio control link, a German MCLOS radio control system of World War II

See also
Josef Straßberger, German weightlifter
 Strasburg (disambiguation)
 Strasberg